The position of president of the National Rifle Association of America (NRA) is a symbolic figurehead role, which dates back to the organization's foundation in New York on November 17, 1871. Founded by George Wood Wingate and William Conant Church, two Union veterans dismayed by the lack of shooting skills among recruits, the rifle association voted to have Union general Ambrose Burnside as its first president. Church succeeded Burnside as the second president of the organization, and Wingate became the tenth in 1886. Traditionally, the first vice president is elevated to president when the position becomes open while the second vice president is similarly promoted, but this practice has not always been followed.

Throughout its history, presidents have served purposes and effects including providing the NRA greater legitimacy; holders of the office have also intentionally provoked outrage and condemnation. Since the 1990s, some NRA presidents have made controversial statements such as when James W. Porter II referred to Barack Obama, whose administration he perceived as hostile to gun rights, as a "fake president" and when Charlton Heston proclaimed to gun control advocates that they could only have his firearm after taking it "from my cold, dead hands."

While once elected at the annual convention, NRA presidents are chosen by the board of directors. They generally serve out two one-year terms. However, the NRA board of directors amended the organization's bylaws to make a personalized exception for actor Charlton Heston to allow him to serve out a unique five-year term. Under said bylaws, the position of president is unpaid. During Oliver North's time in office he sought to make the position a paid one, but this initiative failed when he was ousted as president after a power struggle with executive vice president Wayne LaPierre. Some former presidents have later been employed by the NRA such as Marion Hammer, the association's first female president, who is the executive director of the group's Florida affiliate. Since 1991, the executive vice president, who acts as the group's chief operating officer, has been Wayne LaPierre, despite several internal challenges to his role.

There have been 65 NRA presidents, serving 67 distinct tenures as both Smith W. Brookhart and Carolyn D. Meadows have served two nonconsecutive times in the office. Others who have held the position include former United States president Ulysses S. Grant, lobbyist Harlon Carter, American Football League commissioner Joe Foss, and conservative activist David Keene. The current president  is Charles Cotton.

Presidents of the National Rifle Association

Notes

References 

National Rifle Association